Benjamin Burombo (1909-1959) was a labor union leader and black nationalist in Southern Rhodesia, now Zimbabwe. Born in Buhera in Manicaland, he worked in South Africa, and then in Bulawayo, where he formed the British African National Voice Association in 1947. Better known as the African Workers Voice Association, the union was notable for its role in the 1948 general strike and campaigned against the 1951 Native Land Husbandry Act. The Act was intended to privatise communal lands. Burombo died at a relatively young age, his funeral was a major public event.

References

Zimbabwean activists
1909 births
1959 deaths